Esport Club Granollers is a football team based in Granollers in the autonomous community of Catalonia. Founded in 1913, it plays in the Tercera División RFEF – Group 5. Its stadium is Municipal Carrer Girona with a capacity of 2,500.

Season to season

 1 season in Segunda División
 47 seasons in Tercera División
 1 season in Tercera División RFEF

Notable coaches
 Juan Zambudio Velasco

References

External links
 Official Website

Football clubs in Catalonia
Association football clubs established in 1913
Divisiones Regionales de Fútbol clubs
1913 establishments in Spain
Granollers
Segunda División clubs